Flattery Not Included is the debut album of Mr. B The Gentleman Rhymer, the chap hop musician and satirist. It introduces Mr. B's notion of chap hop, a form of hip hop performed in Received Pronunciation with banjolele accompaniment and chappist lyrical themes concerning nostalgia for Edwardian life (or an idealised version of it), notably cricket, pipe-smoking, and sherry. Other songs focus on hip hop culture and the relations between it and chappism as practised by Mr. B.

Track listing
 "Intro" - 0:16
 "A Piece of My Mind" - 1:58
 "Straight Out of Surrey" - 2:57
 "Timothy" - 2:47
 "Sherry Monocle" - 2:57
 "Let Me Smoke My Pipe" - 2:10
 "The Very Model" - 0:39
 "The Crack Song" - 4:05
 "More Kissing in Porn Please, We're British" - 3:05
 "Mansion House" - 3:15
 "Beats, Rhymes, & Manners" - 2:53
 "Chap-Hop History" - 5:22
 "There'll Always be some Hip-hop" - 0:41

2008 albums